J.Lo is a nickname for American entertainer Jennifer Lopez.

JLO may also refer to:
 J.Lo (album), an album by Jennifer Lopez
 Jason Lo or J Lo (born 1975), Malaysian musician
 Joao Lourenco, president of Angola
 Judgment of Line Orientation
 
 Juvenile Liaison Officer
 J.Lo, a character in The True Meaning of Smekday
Justin Longmuir, nicknamed JLo, Australian footballer
"Jennifer Lopez", a song from the Xiu Xiu EP Chapel of the Chimes